The Ox is a 1991 Swedish drama film directed by Sven Nykvist. He wrote the script with Lasse Summanen, based upon the novel "Oxen" (Stockholm: Prisma, 1981) by Siv Cedering.

Cast 
 Stellan Skarsgård - Helge Roos
 Ewa Fröling - Elfrida Roos
 Lennart Hjulström - Svenning Gustavsson
 Max von Sydow - Vicar 
 Liv Ullmann - Mrs. Gustafsson
 Björn Granath - Flyckt
 Erland Josephson - Sigvard Silver
 Rikard Wolff - Johannes
 Helge Jordal - Navvy
 Agneta Prytz - Old Woman
 Björn Gustafson - Officer in command
 J.E. Beaucaire - Shop Owner
 Debora Hjälmarö - Helge's and Elfrida's daughter Anna

Awards
It was nominated for the Academy Award for Best Foreign Language Film at the 64th Academy Awards in 1992. It was also screened in the Un Certain Regard section at the 1992 Cannes Film Festival. Sven Nykvist was nominated for the Best Cinematography award at the 27th Guldbagge Awards.

See also
 List of submissions to the 64th Academy Awards for Best Foreign Language Film
 List of Swedish submissions for the Academy Award for Best Foreign Language Film

References

External links

1991 films
1991 drama films
Swedish drama films
1990s Swedish-language films
Films directed by Sven Nykvist
Films produced by Jean Doumanian
Films set in the 1860s
Films set in the 1870s
1992 drama films
1992 films
1990s Swedish films